Shanghai People's Radio Station was a radio station in Shanghai China. Since it was merged into Radio and Television Station of Shanghai in 2001, it has been a part of Radio and Television Station of Shanghai.

After the establishment of SMG Radio Centre, Shanghai People's Radio Station was divided and merged into different departments of the centre and only exist in callsigns.

Channels
All Channels of Shanghai Media Group using callsigns with a prefix of "Shanghai People's Radio Station".

References

External links
 Official website

Radio stations in China
Mass media in Shanghai